Nadwatul Musannifeen was an Islamic research academy and institution in Delhi. It was co-founded by Atiqur Rahman Usmani, Hamid al-Ansari Ghazi, Hifzur Rahman Seoharwi and Saeed Ahmad Akbarabadi. The following is a list of books published by Nadwatul Musannifeen.

List of publications

References

Bibliography

Nadwatul Musannifeen

Nadwatul Musannifeen